Thomas Stubbs may refer to:

 Thomas Stubbs (chronicler), English Dominican chronicler
 Thomas Stubbs (cricketer, born 1856) (1856–1899), English cricketer and clergyman
 Thomas Stubbs (cricketer, born 1872) (1872–?), English cricketer
 Tommy Stubbs (born 1990), English boxer